Silas Carson (born 1965) is an English actor, mostly known for playing Jedi Master Ki-Adi-Mundi and Viceroy Nute Gunray in all three of the Star Wars prequels and providing the voice of the Ood in Doctor Who.

Life and career
In Star Wars: Episode I – The Phantom Menace, Carson also plays two other speaking parts, the Senator of the Trade Federation, Lott Dod (although his voice was replaced with that of actor Toby Longworth) and Antidar Williams, the co-pilot of the ship that Qui-Gon Jinn (Liam Neeson) and Obi-Wan Kenobi (Ewan McGregor) are on in the first scene.

He also made a guest appearance on the BBC series Hustle, as Bollywood film fan and perfectionist Kulvinder Samar (whose correct name in the show is actually Kulvinda, but was written as Kulvinder in the credits), and in Spooks and The IT Crowd. He provided alien voices for the Doctor Who episodes "The End of the World", "The Impossible Planet", "The Satan Pit", "Planet of the Ood" and "The End of Time". In the latter four he voiced the Ood, a race once enslaved by humanity.

In late 2007 he appeared in several episodes of BBC's school drama Waterloo Road as blackmailer Stuart Hordley.

Carson also had a minor role in Series one of BBC sit-com Outnumbered as a character named Ravi when Sue and Pete had a dinner party.

He also starred in the third series of BBC3 comedy How Not to Live Your Life, alongside Dan Clark and David Armand. He plays Samantha's university professor/love interest Brian.

Carson is the son of an English father and Indian mother.

Filmography

References

External links
 

1965 births
Date of birth missing (living people)
English people of Indian descent
English male film actors
English male soap opera actors
Living people